Plainwell is a city in Allegan County in the U.S. state of Michigan. The population was 3,804 at the 2010 census.

Plainwell is located on M-89 just east of its junction with US 131. The Kalamazoo River flows through the center of the city and it is known as "The Island City".

History
This part of Michigan was settled in the 1830s, after the removal of native people. Allegan County was organized in 1835, and the Plainwell area was settled soon after. It was on a stagecoach route from Kalamazoo to Grand Rapids, and later the Grand Rapids and Indiana Railroad was constructed along the same route. After the advent of the automobile, U.S. Route 131 was created and run through the town. In the 1960s, an improved 4-lane US-131 was built west of town to connect Kalamazoo and Grand Rapids, with an interchange on M-89 between Plainwell and Otsego. This allowed the town to become a kind of "bedroom community" for Kalamazoo or the southern part of Grand Rapids.

The city is home to a local JBS meat processing plant that employs 1,300 workers, On April 20, 2020, the plant reported 60 cases and 1 death from COVID-19 during the 2019–20 coronavirus pandemic. On April 27, 2020, 86 employees were reported to have been infected with COVID-19. The plant remains open with safety precautions established such as 
others wearing face masks and installed plexiglas between people who work shoulder to shoulder.

Geography
The nickname Island City has to do with a power canal which diverts a portion of the Kalamazoo River around the downtown area, causing it to be an island.

Major highways
 is a freeway that is located in the western portion of the city.
 follows M-89 for most of its route in Plainwell, but soon has a concurrency with U.S. 131 just before the city line.
 has a concurrency with M-43 for most of its route in Plainwell, but continues west alone into Otsego.

Demographics

2010 census
As of the census of 2010, there were 3,804 people, 1,561 households, and 966 families living in the city. The racial makeup of the city was 96.0% White, 1.0% African American, 0.5% Native American, 0.4% Asian, 0.1% Pacific Islander, 0.6% from other races, and 1.5% from two or more races. Hispanic or Latino of any race were 2.3% of the population.

There were 1,561 households, of which 32.4% had children under the age of 18 living with them, 44.3% were married couples living together, 13.6% had a female householder with no husband present, 4.0% had a male householder with no wife present, and 38.1% were non-families. 33.1% of all households were made up of individuals, and 12.1% had someone living alone who was 65 years of age or older. The average household size was 2.33 and the average family size was 2.97.

The median age in the city was 38.7 years. 23.8% of residents were under the age of 18; 9.4% were between the ages of 18 and 24; 24.2% were from 25 to 44; 26.6% were from 45 to 64; and 15.9% were 65 years of age or older. The gender makeup of the city was 46.7% male and 53.3% female.

2000 census
As of the census of 2000, there were 3,933 people, 1,506 households, and 1,018 families living in the city. The racial makeup of the city was 96.77% White, 0.46% African American, 0.48% Native American, 0.36% Asian, 0.66% from other races, and 1.27% from two or more races. Hispanic or Latino of any race were 1.65% of the population.

There were 1,506 households, out of which 35.7% had children under the age of 18 living with them, 50.7% were married couples living together, 13.1% had a female householder with no husband present, and 32.4% were non-families. 26.8% of all households were made up of individuals, and 10.0% had someone living alone who was 65 years of age or older. The average household size was 2.48 and the average family size was 3.01.

In the city, the population was spread out, with 26.5% under the age of 18, 7.9% from 18 to 24, 30.2% from 25 to 44, 19.8% from 45 to 64, and 15.7% who were 65 years of age or older. The median age was 36 years. For every 100 females, there were 91.3 males. For every 100 females age 18 and over, there were 87.5 males.

The median income for a household in the city was $39,590, and the median income for a family was $44,519. Males had a median income of $35,785 versus $26,397 for females. The per capita income for the city was $16,982. About 1.4% of families and 6.1% of the population were below the poverty line, including 2.6% of those under age 18 and 18.8% of those age 65 or over.

Education
K-12 Students are served by the Plainwell School District. There are two high schools, Plainwell High School, and Renaissance High School. Renaissance is the alternative education high school. 
There is only one middle school, Plainwell Middle School.
The school district has three elementary schools. They are Cooper Elementary, Gilkey Elementary, and Starr Elementary.

Michigan Career and Technical Institute is also located nearby.

Notable people
 Jack Conklin, born in Plainwell on August 17, 1994, is an American football offensive tackle for the NFL team the Cleveland Browns. Jack was awarded All-Pro in 2016 and 2020. Jack played football at Michigan State University and was drafted by the Tennessee Titans.
Dave Coverly, born in 1964, grew up in Plainwell. He is a syndicated cartoonist. He is the creator of the Speed Bump comic strips.
 Narada Michael Walden, born in Kalamazoo on April 23, 1952, is an American singer, songwriter, musician, and record producer.
Mallory Comerford, born in Kalamazoo on September 6, 1997, is an American competitive swimmer who went to school in Plainwell. Her college team is at University of Louisville.

See also 
Impact of the 2019–20 coronavirus pandemic on the meat industry in the United States

References

External links
City of Plainwell official website

Cities in Allegan County, Michigan